Sandige or vadagam is a fried snack, originating from the Indian subcontinent,   popular in Karnataka, Andhra Pradesh and Tamil Nadu. It is also served as an accompaniment with meals.

Preparation

Sandige is prepared by making a gruel of the main ingredient and spiced with asafoetida, chili paste and salt. The gruel is poured on a plastic sheet or a big piece of cloth and dried under the sun for a couple of days. To make aralu sandige and avalakki sandige, the main ingredients are added to the gruel and made into balls and sun-dried. Peni and avalakki sandige are made using chakli molds and extruders.

The sun-dried sandige is stored to use throughout the year. It is deep-fried in hot oil before serving.

Types
Different kinds of sandige are listed below with their main ingredients: 
Sabbakki sandige - pearl sago
Aralu sandige - popped rice and ash gourd
Akki peni sandige - rice flour
Avalakki sandige - pounded rice
Godi peni sandige - wheat

See also
 List of Indian dishes
Papadum

References

External links
http://www.smithakalluraya.com/avalakki-sandige-aval-vadam-poha-fryums-indian-sundried-recipes/
http://www.smithakalluraya.com/aralu-sandige-recipe-puffed-paddy-fryums-nel-pori-vadam/
https://www.archanaskitchen.com/karnataka-style-aralu-sandige-recipe-puffed-paddy-fryums

Indian cuisine